Daniyal Robinson is an American collegiate basketball coach. He played college basketball at Indian Hills Community College and the University of Arkansas–Little Rock, then served as an assistant coach for five collegiate teams before being named head coach for Cleveland State University prior to the start of the 2022–23 season.

Playing and assistant coaching career
Robinson is a native of Rock Island, Illinois, and played basketball at Rock Island High School. Robinson then attended Indian Hills Community College for two years, where he continued his basketball career, and subsequently played for the Little Rock Trojans men's basketball team from 1996 to 1998. Robinson remained on the UA–LR staff as an administrative assistant to head coach Porter Moser. In 2003, Robinson joined the coaching staff of the Illinois State Redbirds men's basketball team under Moser. Moser and three of his assistant coaches, including Robinson, were terminated in March 2007. During the 2007–2008 season, Robinson was an assistant coach at his alma mater, the University of Arkansas–Little Rock. Robinson became an assistant coach for the Iowa State Cyclones men's basketball team starting in the 2008–2009 season. From the 2010–2011 season, Robinson was an assistant coach for the Houston Cougars men's basketball program. In 2013, Robinson moved to the Loyola Ramblers men's basketball team, again working under Moser. Before the 2014–15 season began, Robinson was elevated to associate head coach. Robinson returned to Iowa State to work on head coach Steve Prohm's staff in 2015. When T. J. Otzelberger became head coach in 2021, Robinson was retained as an assistant coach.

Head coaching career
In April 2022, Robinson was hired as head coach of the Cleveland State Vikings men's basketball program.

Recruiting and community outreach
During his first stint at Iowa State with head coach Greg McDermott, Robinson was responsible for recruiting players from Chicago and junior colleges. He continued recruiting from those areas in his second stint with Iowa State. Robinson became known for his recruiting ability. Following the deaths of Breonna Taylor, George Floyd, and Jacob Blake, all in 2020, Robinson contacted fellow coaches across the Big 12 Conference. He and the Iowa State coaching staff began discussing several topics with Cyclones' men's basketball players over Zoom, including protests, demonstrations, and unrest that began as a result of these deaths. Following these discussions, the Big 12 Black Assistant Coaches Alliance was established.

Personal life
Dainyal Robinson's older brother David also played basketball for Rock Island High School, at Indian Hills, then later for the Quad City Thunder. Dainyal Robinson married Kim in 2003. The couple raised three children.

Head coaching record

References

Living people
Little Rock Trojans men's basketball players
Iowa State Cyclones men's basketball coaches
Loyola Ramblers men's basketball coaches
Illinois State Redbirds men's basketball coaches
Houston Cougars men's basketball coaches
Cleveland State Vikings men's basketball coaches
Sportspeople from Rock Island, Illinois
Indian Hills Warriors basketball players
African-American basketball coaches
African-American basketball players
Little Rock Trojans men's basketball coaches
1970s births
Basketball players from Illinois